Fundraising plays a central role in many presidential campaigns, and is a key factor in determining the viability of candidates.  Money raised is applied in many ways, such as for the salaries of non-volunteers in the campaign, transportation, campaign materials, and media advertisements.  Under United States law, candidates are required to file campaign finance details with the Federal Elections Commission (FEC) at the end of every calendar month or quarter.  Summaries of these reports are made available to the public shortly thereafter, revealing the relative financial situations of all the campaigns.

July 2012
Campaign Finance information for the month of July 2012 according to the Federal Elections Commission

Democrats

Republicans

Independent

2nd Quarter 2012
Campaign Finance information for the month of April 2012, May 2012, & June 2012 according to the Federal Elections Commission

Democrats

Republicans

1st Quarter 2012
Campaign Finance information for the month of January 2012, February 2012, & March 2012 according to the Federal Elections Commission

Democrats

Republicans

4th Quarter 2011
Campaign Finance information through December 31, 2011, according to the Federal Elections Commission as of January 31, 2012.

Democrats

Republicans

3rd Quarter 2011
Campaign Finance information through September 30, 2011, according to the Federal Elections Commission as of October 15, 2011.

Democrats

Republicans

2nd Quarter 2011
Campaign Finance information through June 30, 2011, according to the Federal Elections Commission as of July 15, 2011.

Democrats

Republicans

1st Quarter 2011
Campaign Finance information through March 30, 2011, according to the Federal Elections Commission as of April 15, 2011.

Republicans

References

External links
Federal Election Commission official website

Fundraising